The 2002 NCAA Women's Gymnastics Championships involved 12 schools competing for the national championship of women's NCAA Division I gymnastics. It was the 21st NCAA gymnastics national championship, and the defending NCAA Team Champion for 2001 was UCLA. The competition took place in Tuscaloosa, Alabama, hosted by the University of Alabama in Coleman Coliseum. The 2002 championship was won by Alabama, their first since 1996 and fourth all time.

Champions

Team results

Session 1

Session 2

Super Six

External links
 NCAA Gymnastics Championship official site

NCAA Women's Gymnastics championship
2002 in women's gymnastics